Richard Plant may refer to:
Richard Plant (writer) (1910–1998), German-American academic, gay author and historian
Richard Plant (racing driver) (born 1989), British racing driver

See also
Richard Plant Bower (1905–1996), Canadian diplomat